Anezi Okoro is a Nigerian writer and medical practitioner. He is best known for his 1972 novel One Week One Trouble.

Early life and career
Anezi was born in Arondizuogu of Imo State, Nigeria in 1929. 

Dr. Okoro had his secondary school education at Methodist College, Uzuakoli, Abia State, Nigeria.

Anezi worked as a House surgeon, University College Hospital, Ibadan from 1957 to 1959. He began his career as an academic in 1975 as a Professor of Medicine, University of Nigeria, Nsukka. He was the president of African Association for Dermatology from 1986 to 1991. Director, Nigerian National Petroleum Corporation in Lagos from 1977 to 1981. He was a visiting Professor, Medical College of Georgia, Augusta in 1987, and University of Minnesota, Minneapolis, 1988, King Faisal University, Dammam Saudi Arabia as  professor of dermatology from 1989 to 1995.

Bibliography
The Village School (1966) 
The Village Headmaster (1967) 
Febechi down the Niger (1971) 
Febechi in Cave Adventure (1971) 
One Week in Trouble (1973) 
Dr. Amadi's Postings (1975) Pictorial Handbook of Common Skin Diseases (1981) Education Is Great (1986) Double Trouble(1990) *Pariah Earth and Other Stories (1994) The Second Great Flood'' (1999)

References

Igbo writers
Igbo educators
Nigerian writers
1929 births
Living people
People from Imo State